Cine Club is a movie theater in Universidad Austral, Valdivia, Chile. The theater is located in Universidad Austral de Chile's Isla Teja campus. Cine Club was founded in 1982 and organizes the annual Valdivia International Film Festival since 1992, when it was created on its 10th anniversary.

Austral University of Chile
Cinemas in Chile
Buildings and structures in Los Ríos Region
Valdivia